The 1968 Torneio Norte-Nordeste was the first edition of a football competition held in Brazil. In the finals, Sport Recife defeated Remo 5–2 on aggregate to win their first title and earn the right to play in the Torneio dos Campeões da CBD.

North Zone

|}

Northeast Zone

Final stage

Finals

Sport Recife won 5–2 on aggregate.

References

Torneio Norte-Nordeste
Torneio Norte-Nordeste